Bodies in Motion may refer to one of the following:

A television fitness show hosted by Gilad Janklowicz
An episode of CSI: Crime Scene Investigation (season 6)
A book about motorcycling by Steven L. Thompson